In mathematical analysis, many generalizations of Fourier series have proved to be useful.  They are all special cases of decompositions over an orthonormal basis of an inner product space.  Here we consider that of square-integrable functions defined on an interval of the real line, which is important, among others, for interpolation theory.

Definition

which are pairwise orthogonal for the inner product

The generalized Fourier series of a square-integrable function , with respect to Φ, is then

where the coefficients are given by

If Φ is a complete set, i.e., an orthogonal basis of the space of all square-integrable functions on [a, b], as opposed to a smaller orthogonal set, the relation  becomes equality in the L2 sense, more precisely modulo  (not necessarily pointwise, nor almost everywhere).

Example (Fourier–Legendre series)
The Legendre polynomials are solutions to the Sturm–Liouville problem

 

and because of Sturm-Liouville theory, these polynomials are eigenfunctions of the problem and are solutions orthogonal with respect to the inner product above with unit weight. So we can form a generalized Fourier series (known as a Fourier–Legendre series) involving the Legendre polynomials, and

As an example, let us calculate the Fourier–Legendre series for f(x) = cos x over [−1, 1]. Now,

and a series involving these terms

which differs from cos x by approximately 0.003, about 0. It may be advantageous to use such Fourier–Legendre series since the eigenfunctions are all polynomials and hence the integrals and thus the coefficients are easier to calculate.

Coefficient theorems
Some theorems on the coefficients cn include:

Bessel's inequality

Parseval's theorem
If Φ is a complete set, then

See also
Banach space
Eigenfunctions
Fractional Fourier transform
Function space
Hilbert space
Least-squares spectral analysis
Orthogonal function
Orthogonality
Topological vector space
Vector space

Fourier analysis